Triton (TRN) was a demogroup active in the PC demoscene from 1992 to about 1996.

History 
Triton's first demo, Crystal Dream, was released in the summer of 1992 and won the PC demo competition at the Hackerence V demo party. Their second and last demo, Crystal Dream 2, was released June 1993 and won the demo competition at The Computer Crossroads 1993 party in Gothenburg.  In 1993 they released a multi-channel MOD composer called Fast Tracker, followed by the XM module composer Fast Tracker 2 in 1994.

Triton created a commercial demo for Gravis Ultrasound cards.

Most of their work was done using a combination of x86 assembler and Pascal using either Turbo Pascal or Borland Pascal 7 compilers.

Triton began developing on a fighting game named Into the Shadows. A game demo showing a character was released in 1995, but the development was stopped thereafter. In 1998, some of Triton's members founded the computer game development company Starbreeze Studios, that merged with O3 Games  in 2001.

Members 

 Team founders (1992):
 Vogue (Magnus Högdahl) - code, music
 Mr. H (Fredrik Huss) - code
 Loot (Anders Aldengård) - graphics, raytracing
 Members hired in 1993:
 Lizardking (Gustaf Grefberg) - music
 Joachim (Joachim Barrum) - graphics
 Alt (Mikko Tähtinen) - graphics

Releases 
 Crystal Dream (1992, demo, 1st at Hackerence 92)
 Crystal Dream 2 (1993, demo, 1st at The Computer Crossroads 93)
 FastTracker 2 (1995, tracker)

References

External links 
 Triton archive on Pouet
 Triton on Demozoo
 Starbreeze Studios Website

Demogroups